Theodore Goodson III (born April 5, 1969) is an American chemist who is the Richard Barry Bernstein Professor of Chemistry at the University of Michigan. Goodson studies the non-linear optical properties of novel organic materials. He was elected fellow of the American Association for the Advancement of Science in 2012 and the American Institute for Medical and Biological Engineering in 2021.

Early life and education 
Goodson was an undergraduate student at Wabash College, a liberal arts college in Indiana. He moved to the University of Nebraska–Lincoln for graduate studies, where he majored in chemistry. His research considered the non-linear optical properties of organic polymers. He worked in both the University of Chicago and University of Oxford as a postdoctoral scholar.

Research and career 
In 1998, Goodson joined the faculty at Wayne State University. He moved to the University of Michigan as a Professor of Chemistry in 2004. He demonstrated that ultrafast laser spectroscopy could be used to better understand materials for solar energy. In particular, he was building highly branched macromolecules. Whilst studying these macromolecules, Goodson and his co-worker Guo noticed that a hyperbranched phthalocyanine compound exhibited large and delocalized polarization. When voltages were applied to these phthalocyanines, charge carriers hopped around the structure. These phthalocyanines had high dielectric constants, which indicated that they would be better suited as the dielectric medium inside capacitors. In 2010, he became Chief Science Officer for Wolverine Energy Solutions & Technology. The spin-out company makes use of organic energy storage materials to make capacitors.

Awards and honors 
 2011 Percy L. Julian Award
 2012 Elected Fellow of the American Association for the Advancement of Science
 2012 University of Michigan Distinguished Faculty Achievement Award
 2012 California State University, Los Angeles Lloyd Ferguson Distinguished Lecturer 
 2013 Sigma Xi Distinguished Lecturer
 2014 American Chemical Society Fellow from the Physical Chemistry Division
 2021 Elected to the American Institute for Medical and Biological Engineering

Selected publications

Personal life 
Goodson is married to physician Stephanie Goodson.

References 

American chemists
University of Michigan faculty
Wabash College alumni
University of Nebraska–Lincoln alumni
Fellows of the American Association for the Advancement of Science
Fellows of the American Institute for Medical and Biological Engineering
1969 births
Living people